Dawn of a New Day is the debut studio album by Canadian country music singer Crystal Shawanda. It was released in Canada on June 24, 2008, and in the United States on August 19. It produced five singles in "You Can Let Go", "What Do I Have to Do", "My Roots Are Showing", the title track and "Try". "You Can Let Go" reached number 21 on the Hot Country Songs charts.

Track listing

Personnel

 Bruce Bouton - lap steel guitar, pedal steel guitar
 Mike Brignardello - bass guitar
 Pat Buchanan - electric guitar
 Tom Bukovac - electric guitar
 Lisa Cochran - background vocals
 Perry Coleman - background vocals
 J.T. Corenflos - electric guitar
 Melodie Crittenden - background vocals
 Rob Hajacos - fiddle
 Tony Harrell - Hammond B-3 organ, piano, synthesizer
 Aubrey Haynie - fiddle, mandolin
 Mike Johnson - pedal steel guitar
 Troy Lancaster - acoustic guitar, electric guitar
 B. James Lowry - acoustic guitar
 Chris McHugh - drums
 Gene Miller - background vocals
 Greg Morrow - drums, percussion
 Gordon Mote - Hammond B-3 organ, piano, synthesizer, Wurlitzer
 Crystal Shawanda - lead vocals
 Jimmie Lee Sloas - bass guitar
 DeWayne Strobel - electric guitar
 Bryan Sutton - acoustic guitar
 Russell Terrell - background vocals
 Bobby Terry - acoustic guitar
 Jonathan Yudkin - fiddle, mandolin, strings

Chart performance

Album

Singles

Notes

a^ "You Can Let Go" also reached number nine on the Bubbling Under Hot 100 Singles chart.

References

2008 debut albums
Albums produced by Scott Hendricks
Crystal Shawanda albums
RCA Records albums